Cleveland Island is a small heavily forested island located in Wakeby Pond in Mashpee, Massachusetts.  It once belonged to president Grover Cleveland.  Cleveland once said that Daniel Webster caught a trout near the island, and then "talked mighty strong and fine to that fish and told him what a mistake he had made, and that he would have been all right if he had left the bait alone.

References

Lake islands of Massachusetts
Islands of Barnstable County, Massachusetts
Mashpee, Massachusetts
Uninhabited islands of Massachusetts
Coastal islands of Massachusetts